University Sports South Africa (USSA) is the governing body for higher education sport in the South Africa.

Leagues, Competitions and Events

FISU Events Organised
World University Championship:
7th WUC Golf - San Lameer - 1998
12th WUC Golf - Sun City - 2008

All-Africa University Games
IV - Tshwane
VIII - Johannesburg

References

External links
 Official website

International University Sports Federation
University
Sports organizations established in 1992
Student sport in South Africa
Student sports governing bodies
1992 establishments in South Africa
University and college sports